Recurring Dream: The Very Best of Crowded House, usually abbreviated to Recurring Dream, is a compilation album by rock group Crowded House, released in 1996. It includes most of their singles, as well as three new songs, "Not the Girl You Think You Are", "Instinct", and "Everything Is Good for You".

Background
Crowded House were touring in support of their album Together Alone, when after a concert in Atlanta on 14 April 1994, drummer Paul Hester decided to leave the band. He was eventually replaced by Peter Jones. The band completed the tour and returned to Australia where bandleader Neil Finn began writing songs for their next album, provisionally titled Help Is Coming. During this time he also wrote and recorded the album Finn with his brother Tim Finn. At a press conference in 1996, at which the release of Recurring Dream was announced, Neil Finn revealed that Crowded House were to split up. The June concerts in Europe and Canada would be their final shows.

The collection was released in June 1996 and features four songs from each of the group's four studio albums, as well as the three new songs. Hester returned to play on these songs, but despite this he is not credited as a full band member on the album sleeve, which reads, "Performed by Crowded House (Neil Finn, Nick Seymour and Mark Hart) with Paul Hester." The new photos on the album sleeve only show Neil Finn, Seymour and Hart, although Hester and Tim Finn both appear several times in a collage of old band photos. The wording on the album implies that Hart played on all 19 tracks. In fact he only became a full band member on their fourth album Together Alone, although he did receive an 'additional keyboards' credit for unspecified tracks on the album Woodface. Hester may not appear on the song "Weather with You", because Ricky Fataar is credited with drums on that track on the Woodface sleeve.

The album's title Recurring Dream, is also the name of a song written in 1985, when the group were still known as 'The Mullanes', by Finn, Hester, Seymour and the band's then guitarist Craig Hooper. The song "Recurring Dream" was not included on this compilation, but was later featured on Afterglow, Crowded House's 1999 rarities collection. At the 1997 ARIA Music Awards, Recurring Dream won in the 'Highest Selling Album' category. The award was presented by Dave Graney who joked in his presentation speech that it's, "Sometimes just about the money!"

The album's cover was painted by bassist Nick Seymour. Like Together Alone and Temple of Low Men it features a red car. The cover also shows an electric fan, an item which appeared on the sleeve of their debut album. The bare chested man on the album cover appears to be Seymour himself.

New songs
Three new tracks were recorded specially for Recurring Dream by Finn, Seymour, Hart and Hester. "Everything Is Good for You", "Instinct" and "Not the Girl You Think You Are" were recorded at York Street Studios in Auckland, New Zealand and were produced by Finn, Mitchell Froom and Tchad Blake. In a 2006 interview, Neil Finn said of "Everything Is Good for You", "The philosophy of the song is slightly obscure in the verses, but really it's about not allowing regrets to rule your life. But it's also got a sense of humour. There's a wryness to it. It's not a message song particularly."

Of "Instinct" he said, "I did a demo of it at home. It's just built on a bass riff...I put down a drum track, put a bass track to it and had it around for about a month. The lyrics are, as it turns out, extremely appropriate for the time: Nearly time to flick the switch/Hanging by a single stitch/Laughing at the stony face of gloom. I mean, in a way it was an instinctive decision for me to discontinue working with the band. My stomach told me to do it, so that's what the song is about: recognizing those moments and having the desire to follow it through."

Of "Not the Girl You Think You Are" he said, "I wrote that with the assistance of an Optigan keyboard, which is a weird old antique from the '60s, a trashy antique. It's a machine that reads optical discs, the most primitive form of sampling from the '60s. I had found piano loops on it that I just put a sequence together from and I wrote the song in 10 minutes on top of it."

Due to this compilation being superseded by The Very Very Best of Crowded House in 2010 and "Everything Is Good for You" being omitted from that album, all three tracks were included on the 2016 deluxe edition of Afterglow.

Track listing
All songs were written by Neil Finn, except where noted.

Special Edition Live Album

Recurring Dream was also released as a two-disc version, the second disc being titled Special Edition Live Album. The songs were selected by Split Enz bassist Nigel Griggs, who was asked to do the job by Neil Finn, according to the album's sleeve notes. Just days after he accepted the job, hundreds of cassettes of Crowded House performances arrived for him to evaluate. The recordings he chose were not remixed or adjusted in any way before they were put on the album. Only four of the tracks from the main album had their live versions included on the second disc.

Five of the live album's songs are from the same concert, at The Civic Theatre in Newcastle, Australia. Other songs from this performance have appeared as B-sides, including "Chocolate Cake" on the "Instinct" single. The recording of "Fingers of Love" comes from Paul Hester's final show, in Atlanta, before he quit the band.

Track listing

The album is performed by Neil Finn, Nick Seymour, Paul Hester and Mark Hart, apart from tracks 7, 8, 9 and 10 which feature Tim Finn rather than Hart.

Charts

Weekly charts

Year-end charts

Decade-end charts

Certifications

See also 
 List of best-selling albums in Australia

Further reading

References
General
 

Specific

External links
Crowded House official website

1996 greatest hits albums
1996 live albums
Crowded House albums
Capitol Records compilation albums
Albums produced by Tchad Blake
Albums produced by Mitchell Froom
ARIA Award-winning albums
Compilation albums by Australian artists